Sabzak (also Romanized as Sabzok; also known as Īshak Chūpān and Sabzeh) is a village in Kharaqan-e Sharqi Rural District, Abgarm District, Avaj County, Qazvin Province, Iran. At the 2006 census, its population was 239, in 62 families.

References 

Populated places in Avaj County